The Dodge Viper (SR I) is the first generation of the Viper sports car, manufactured by American automobile manufacturer Dodge. It was originally tested in January 1989 as a prototype, then later introduced in 1991 as a pace car for the Indianapolis 500, then finally going on sale in January 1992.

The SR I began the Dodge Viper model lineup, which would continue on until 2017, consisting of five generations.

The SRI was replaced by the updated SRII after a series of updates in 1995.

History and development 

The original Viper was intended to be a performance sports car. The project was started in 1988 at Chrysler's Advanced Design Studios, when then-president Bob Lutz suggested to Tom Gale that the company should consider the production of a modern Cobra. A clay model was created months later, and the car later appeared as a concept in 1989 at the North American International Auto Show. Chief engineer Roy Sjoberg was then directed to develop the car after public reactions of the initial concept were highly positive.

"Team Viper" was later formed with 85 engineers selected by Sjoberg, and development of the car began in March 1989, with full completion in February 1990.

It was later introduced in 1991 at the Indianapolis 500 of that year with a pre-production car driven by Carroll Shelby, being forced to replace the Dodge Stealth because of complaints coming from the United Automobile Workers. It later went on sale as the Dodge Viper RT/10 Roadster in January 1992.

Engineering and design 
The Viper lacks modern driver aids such as traction control and anti-lock brakes. The car also has no exterior-mounted door handles or key locks, and instead, entry is done by unzipping a vinyl window to reach the interior door release handle (when the canvas/hard top is in place). No air conditioning was installed on the car (the option for A/C was added in later 1994 models). There were also no airbags for weight reduction. The roof was made from canvas, and the windows were made from vinyl and used zippers to open and close. Despite these lack of features, the car still had some features in order for it to be tolerable as a daily driving car, such as manually-adjustable seats with lumbar support, an AM/FM stereo player, a clock, and carpeting.

Later models of the Viper allowed the option for a lightweight fiberglass hard top to replace the standard canvas soft top.

Lamborghini, who was owned by Chrysler Corporation at the time, assisted with the design of the aluminum-alloy V10 engine for the car, with the design based on Chrysler's LA engine. Dick Winkles, the chief power engineer, was a major contributor on the engine project, and had spent time in Italy for the purpose of the engine's development.

Specifications and performance 

Its large tires allowed the car to average 0.96 lateral g in corners, which placed it among the best performance cars of its day, however, the car proved tricky for the unskilled drivers.

Gallery

References 

Viper SR I
Sports cars
Cars introduced in 1992